John Welbourn (born March 30, 1976) is a former American football offensive tackle and guard.  He was drafted by the Philadelphia Eagles in the fourth round of the 1999 NFL Draft. He played college football for the California Golden Bears at the University of California, Berkeley.  Welbourn has also been a member of the Kansas City Chiefs and New England Patriots. John is now the creator and operator of Power Athlete HQ.

Early years
John Welbourn attended Palos Verdes High School and Palos Verdes Peninsula High School in Rolling Hills Estates, California where he lettered in football and track.  He attended the University of California, Berkeley on a football scholarship.  He graduated in four years with a B.A. in Rhetoric.  He then went on to do his masters work in Education.

Professional career

Philadelphia Eagles
John Welbourn came into the National Football League in 1999 after being drafted by the Philadelphia Eagles with the second pick in the fourth round of the 1999 NFL Draft.  He went on to start his first professional game versus the Arizona Cardinals.  He was injured at the end of the second quarter and was placed on injured reserve. He came back the following year and started all 16 regular season games for the Eagles.  He continued to play for the Eagles as a starter at left guard through the 2003 season.

Kansas City Chiefs
John Welbourn was traded to the Kansas City Chiefs for second- and fourth-round draft picks. He went on to start at right tackle for the Chiefs for the 2004, 2005 and 2006 seasons. In 2005 he was suspended for four games for violation of the NFL's substance abuse policy, and in 2006 he received a six-week suspension for a second violation. In 2007 he started all 16 games for the Chiefs at right guard. He was released at the end of the season with one year left on his contract.

New England Patriots
On August 4, 2008, John Welbourn was signed by the New England Patriots. He was released on August 31.

After NFL
John is now the creator and operator of Power Athlete HQ and travels the world lecturing on performance and nutrition. Since retiring from the NFL in 2009, he has consulted and trained athletes in MLB, NHL, NFL, CrossFit and the Olympics. He has also worked in the same capacity for Naval Special Warfare and the U.S Army, teaching performance focused training.

References

External links
New England Patriots bio
Personal website
PowerAthlete HQ

1976 births
Living people
Players of American football from Los Angeles
Players of American football from Torrance, California
American football offensive guards
American football offensive tackles
California Golden Bears football players
Philadelphia Eagles players
Kansas City Chiefs players
New England Patriots players
CrossFit coaches
Sports coaches from Los Angeles